Comalcalco is a city located in Comalcalco Municipality about 45 miles (60 km) northwest of Villahermosa in the Mexican state of Tabasco. Near the city is the Pre-Columbian Maya archaeological site of Comalcalco. The literal English translation of "Comalcalco" is "In the house of the comals". A comal is a pan used to prepare food.

Demography
The present-day city of Comalcalco reported a 2005 census population of 39,865 inhabitants, while the municipality of which it serves as municipal seat had a population of 173,773. The city is the third-largest community in the state of Tabasco, behind Villahermosa and Cárdenas. The municipality, which has an area of 723.19 km2 (279.225 sq mi), includes many smaller outlying communities, the largest of which are Tecolutilla, Chichicapa, Aldama, and Miguel Hidalgo.

Archaeological site

The site of Comalcalco, whose coordinates are 18°16′N 93°10′W, is notable for two characteristics.  First, it is the westernmost known Maya settlement.  Second, and due to a dearth of locally available limestone (the primary material used in architectural construction), the city's buildings were made from fired-clay bricks held together with mortar made from oyster shells. The use of bricks at Comalcalco was unique among Maya sites, and many of them are decorated with iconography and/or glyphs. Important architectural features include the  northern plaza and two pyramids, the Gran Acropolis and the Acropolis Este.

Economy
Comalcalco has fertile soil.  Large amounts of  tropical products are grown.  Corn and beans and vegetables are also cultivated.  Cocoa is the largest harvest in Comalcalco. Comalcalco produces 20% of the cocoa harvested in the state of Tabasco. Also coconut, avocado, and some tropical fruits are important in some zones.
Livestock raising, even though it is not widely practiced, is of high quality, most ranchers have their farms just sideout of Comalcalco, away from urban development.

Comalcalco produces 5% of the total extracted petroleum in the state of Tabasco.

History

In 1820, the river Mazacalapa was drying up, and many of the families made residence in the middle of the river on an island.  The Government of the State of Tabasco; consisting of Juan Mariano Sale, Antonio Solana and Fausto Gordillo, and all members of the congress;  established a town in October, and named it Isidro de Comcalco. The decree was published by Don Marcelino Margalli, governor of the state and Jose Mariano Troncoso, who was secretary of the state. The town is located in the Comalcalco municipalities, and on November 14 of 1834 the first local government was created.

References
 INEGI: Instituto Nacional de Estadística, Geografía e Informática
 Enciclopedia de los Municipios de México

External links
Official Website Ayuntamiento de Comalcalco

 
Populated places in Tabasco